The Americas Zone was one of the three zones of the regional Davis Cup competition in 1996.

In the Americas Zone there were three different tiers, called groups, in which teams compete against each other to advance to the upper tier. Winners in Group II advanced to the Americas Zone Group I. Teams who lost their respective ties competed in the relegation play-offs, with winning teams remaining in Group II, whereas teams who lost their play-offs were relegated to the Americas Zone Group III in 1997.

Participating nations

Draw

 and  relegated to Group III in 1997.
 promoted to Group I in 1997.

First round

Uruguay vs. Guatemala

Colombia vs. Puerto Rico

Cuba vs. Paraguay

Ecuador vs. Barbados

Second round

Uruguay vs. Colombia

Cuba vs. Ecuador

Relegation play-offs

Guatemala vs. Puerto Rico

Paraguay vs. Barbados

Third round

Ecuador vs. Uruguay

References

External links
Davis Cup official website

Davis Cup Americas Zone
Americas Zone Group II